St Catherine's Hill may refer to:
 St Catherine's Hill, Dorset
 St Catherine's Hill, Isle of Wight
 St. Catherine's Hill, Hampshire